One of the Baffin Island offshore, uninhabited island groups, the Kaigosuiyat Islands are located between Irvine Inlet and Nettilling Fiord, south of Iglunga and southwest of Pangnirtung. They are part of the Qikiqtaaluk Region, in the Canadian territory of Nunavut.

References

External links 
 Kaigosuiyat Islands in the Atlas of Canada - Toporama; Natural Resources Canada

Archipelagoes of Baffin Island
Uninhabited islands of Qikiqtaaluk Region